Pip Meo (born 6 January 1984) is a former association football player who represented New Zealand at international level.

Meo made her Football Ferns début in a 0–2 loss to Australia on 18 February 2004, and finished her international career with five caps to her credit.

References

1984 births
Living people
New Zealand women's international footballers
New Zealand women's association footballers
Women's association footballers not categorized by position